Éric David Cantú Guerrero (born 28 February 1999) is a Mexican professional footballer who plays as a midfielder for Liga de Expansión MX club Raya2, on loan from Monterrey.

International career
Cantú was called up by Jaime Lozano to participate with the under-23 team at the 2019 Pan American Games, with Mexico winning the third-place match.

Career statistics

Club

Honours
Monterrey
Liga MX: Apertura 2019
Copa MX: 2019–20
CONCACAF Champions League: 2019, 2021

Mexico U23
Pan American Bronze Medal: 2019

References

External links
 
 
 
 
 

1999 births
Living people
Mexico international footballers
Footballers from Nuevo León
Association football defenders
C.F. Monterrey players
Sportspeople from Monterrey
Liga MX players
Pan American Games medalists in football
Pan American Games bronze medalists for Mexico
Footballers at the 2019 Pan American Games
Medalists at the 2019 Pan American Games
Raya2 Expansión players
Mexican footballers